The Chant is the second album by bassist and cellist Sam Jones featuring performances recorded in early 1961 and originally released on the Riverside label.

Reception

Scott Yanow of Allmusic says, "all eight selections in this straightahead set are rewarding".

Track listing
 "The Chant" (Victor Feldman) - 3:24 
 "Four" (Miles Davis) - 4:23  
 "Blues on Down" (Benny Golson) - 5:45  
 "Sonny Boy" (Lew Brown, Bud DeSylva, Ray Henderson) - 4:54  
 "In Walked Ray" (Sam Jones) - 4:04   
 "Bluebird" (Charlie Parker) - 4:10  
 "Over the Rainbow" (Harold Arlen, Yip Harburg) - 6:37  
 "Off Color" (Rudy Stevenson) - 4:26

Personnel
Sam Jones - bass (tracks 1-3 & 8), cello (tracks 4–7)
Nat Adderley - cornet 
Blue Mitchell - trumpet 
Melba Liston - trombone
Cannonball Adderley - alto saxophone
Jimmy Heath - tenor saxophone 
Tate Houston - baritone saxophone 
Wynton Kelly - piano (tracks 4, 6 & 7)
Victor Feldman - piano (tracks 1–3, 5 & 8), vibraphone (tracks 4–7)
Les Spann - guitar (tracks 1, 2, 3 & 8)
Keter Betts - bass (tracks 4–7)
Louis Hayes - drums

References 

Riverside Records albums
Sam Jones (musician) albums
1961 albums
Albums produced by Orrin Keepnews